"Back Where You Started" is a popular album track and the second (promotional only) single released in the United States by rock/soul singer Tina Turner, from her Platinum-certified Break Every Rule album.

The song was written by Bryan Adams and Jim Vallance, and produced by Adams and Bob Clearmountain. It was the second collaboration between Turner and Adams, their first being the 1985 hit "It's Only Love". Although "Back Where You Started" was never released commercially as a single, it was a hit on the US Rock Chart and won Turner a Grammy Award for Best Rock Vocal Performance, Female in 1987.

Personnel 
 Tina Turner – lead vocals 
 Bryan Adams – acoustic piano, guitars, backing vocals 
 Tommy Mandel – Hammond organ
 Keith Scott – lead guitar 
 Dave Taylor – bass 
 Mickey Curry – drums 
 Jim Vallance – percussion

Chart performance

References

Tina Turner songs
1986 singles
1986 songs
Songs written by Jim Vallance
Grammy Award for Best Female Rock Vocal Performance
Song recordings produced by Bob Clearmountain
American hard rock songs
Songs written by Bryan Adams